The Beat is a 2003 drama written and directed by Brandon Sonnier and was screened at the 2003 Sundance Film Festival. At 20 years of age, Sonnier was the youngest director to have a feature film debut at the Sundance Film Festival. The previous record was held by Robert Rodriguez for El Mariachi. With limited release on Showtime, Black STARZ, and Encore in 2005, the film became an underground hip hop cult-classic, supported by a cast of internationally recognized rap artists such as Chino XL, Tak (Styles of Beyond) and Coolio, as well as Def Poetry Jam's Steve Connell. The film's star, Rahman Jamaal also wrote and produced the film's hip hop soundtrack.

Plot
Philip Randall Bernard a.k.a. "Flip" (Rahman Jamaal) is faced with the decision to join the police force, or attempt to live his dream of becoming a Hip Hop/spoken word artist. The film shows both of Flip's possible futures.

Cast
Rahman Jamaal
Jazsmin Lewis
Gregory Alan Williams
Brian McKnight
Steve Connell
Jermaine Williams
Chino XL

External links

References

2003 films
2003 drama films
American drama films
2000s English-language films
2000s American films